Robin Haase was the defending champion but lost in the first round to Thiemo de Bakker.

Guillermo García López won the title after defeating Ruben Bemelmans 6–1, 6–7(3–7), 6–2 in the final.

Seeds

Draw

Finals

Top half

Bottom half

References
Main Draw
Qualifying Draw

The Hague Open - Singles
2017 Singles